Trichodorcadion is a genus of longhorn beetles of the subfamily Lamiinae, containing the following species:

 Trichodorcadion dubiosum Breuning, 1954
 Trichodorcadion gardneri Breuning, 1942

References

Dorcadiini